Saint-Mary-le-Plain is a commune in the Cantal department in south-central France.

Population

See also
 Communes of the Cantal department

References

Communes of Cantal
Cantal communes articles needing translation from French Wikipedia